Naomi Ehrich Leonard  is the Edwin S. Wilsey Professor of Mechanical and Aerospace Engineering at Princeton University. She is the director of the Princeton Council on Science and Technology and an associated faculty member in the Program in Applied & Computational Mathematics, Princeton Neuroscience Institute, and the Program in Quantitative and Computational Biology. She is the founding editor of the Annual Review of Control, Robotics, and Autonomous Systems.

Life
Leonard graduated from Princeton University with a B.S.E. degree in mechanical engineering in 1985. 
From 1985 to 1989, she worked in the electric power industry. 
She graduated from the University of Maryland with a M.S. in 1991 and Ph.D. in 1994, in electrical engineering, under the supervision of P. S. Krishnaprasad.  She Joined Princeton's faculty as an assistant professor of Mechanical and Aerospace Engineering in 1994.

Research
Leonard's research is in the area of dynamics and control theory. 
Her early work involved the development of "energy-shaping" methods of feedback control for single vehicles. It has applications to the control theory of more general mechanical systems.
She later expanded her work to the control of multi-agent systems, with an emphasis on collective sensing, decision-making, and motion. Her work includes the study of multi-agent systems in nature and the application of insights from nature to man-made systems.

Many of Leonard's projects have involved the control of aquatic vehicles. She operates the underwater robotic tank lab at Princeton. 
She has worked for a number of years with the Autonomous Ocean Sampling Network. 
In 2006, she led the Adaptive Sampling and Prediction project, which used 10 underwater vehicles to form an automated and adaptive ocean observing system in Monterey Bay.

In developing algorithms for robot control, she integrates physics and fluid mechanics with research about uncertainty and collective decision-making. She draws upon nature for her models, studying the animal flocking behavior of fish, honeybees, and birds. Her autonomous robotic swarms mimic schools of fish and are used to collect data and explore their marine environment.

Awards
 1995 National Science Foundation CAREER Award
 2004 MacArthur Fellows Program
 2007 IEEE Fellow
 2011 ASME Fellow
 2012 Fellow of the Society for Industrial and Applied Mathematics
 2014 Fellow of the International Federation of Automatic Control

References

External links
Nokia Distinguished Lecture: Naomi Leonard on Collective Motion and Sensing Networks in Nature and Robotics
Seminar Feb. 7th: Dr. Naomi Leonard - Mobile Sensor Networks
Naomi Leonard (Princeton) 32-141 LIDS Colloquium
"Naomi E. Leonard", Scientific Commons

Living people
Year of birth missing (living people)
21st-century American engineers
Princeton University faculty
Princeton University alumni
University of Maryland, College Park alumni
MacArthur Fellows
Fellow Members of the IEEE
Fellows of the American Society of Mechanical Engineers
Fellows of the Society for Industrial and Applied Mathematics
Fellows of the International Federation of Automatic Control
Annual Reviews (publisher) editors